The jihadist flag is a flag commonly used by various Islamist and Islamic fundamentalist movements as a symbol of jihad. It usually consists of a black background with a white text of the shahada (Islamic creed) emblazoned across it in calligraphy style writing. Its usage was widely adopted by jihadists in the early 2000s, and in the 2010s by the Islamic State. Aside from Islamism, the flag has also been used by various Islamic terrorist organizations.

Organizations which have used such a flag include:

 al-Qaeda
 al-Shabaab
 Islamic State (ISIS/ISIL/IS/Daesh)
 Hizbul Islam (2009)
 the Taliban, which is a black-on-white variant

In the last decade of the South Thailand insurgency, the al-Raya' flag has largely replaced the colourful secessionist flags formerly used by different rebel groups.

Islamic State variant

The variant used by the Islamic State, and before that by the Islamic State of Iraq (since  2006) depicts the second phrase of the shahada in the form of a depiction of the supposedly historical seal of Muhammad.

In August 2014, British Prime Minister David Cameron suggested that anybody displaying "the Islamic State flag" in the United Kingdom should be arrested. Citing the Terrorism Act 2000, section 13 (1b) of the act states "[a] person in a public place commits an offence if he wears, carries or displays an article in such a way or in such circumstances as to arouse reasonable suspicion that he is a member or supporter of a proscribed organisation" and can face six months in prison or a statutory fine.

It has also been banned from public demonstration in the Netherlands since August 2014.

The use of the image of the IS flag (but not other versions of the black standard) for non-educational purposes has been forbidden in Germany by the Federal Ministry of the Interior since September 2014. Neighbouring Austria proposed a ban in the same month.

See also

 Black Banner Organization
 Islamic flags
 List of black flags
 Tawhid

References

External links

Collection of imagery of black flags used in Islamic extremism
 The Black Flag (al-raya) at The Islamic Imagery Project, The Combating Terrorism Center at West Point
The Semiotics of a Black Flag (makingsenseofjihad.com)
Usama Hasan, The Black Flags of Khurasan (unity1.wordpress.com)

Flags representing the Shahada
Religious symbols
Black symbols
Religious flags
Islamism
Jihadism
Islamic terminology
Flag controversies
Censorship in Germany